Arthur Wallis Mills (often abbreviated A. Wallis Mills, as well as A. W. Mills) (1878–1940) was a British artist. As well as traditional art forms, Mills also produced artwork and occasional cartoons for Punch Magazine, The Strand Magazine, The Humourist, The Black and White Illustrated Budget and The Royal Magazine in the United Kingdom as well as The Wanganui Chronicle in New Zealand. He also illustrated A Cabinet Secret (Guy Boothby, 1901), the 1908 edition of The Novels of Jane Austen in Ten Volumes, The Zincali - An account of the gypsies of Spain (George Borrow, 1841) and The Red Book of Heroes (Andrew Lang, 1909).

Mills illustrated many of P. G. Wodehouse's stories in magazines, including Indiscretions of Archie (1920–1921), Leave It to Psmith (1923), and 15 of P. G. Wodehouse's Jeeves short stories in The Strand Magazine, the first being "Jeeves in the Springtime" (1921). He illustrated more Jeeves short stories for their original UK magazine publications than any other artist.

Artwork

References

External links
 
 Punch Illustrations by Arthur Wallis Mills in HeidICON

1878 births
1940 deaths
19th-century British painters
British male painters
20th-century British painters
British illustrators
British satirists
Punch (magazine) cartoonists
British comics artists
British caricaturists
19th-century British male artists
20th-century British male artists